The 2000 Rally Catalunya (formally the 36th Rallye Catalunya - Costa Brava) was the fifth round of 2000 World Rally Championship. The race was held over four days between 16 March and 19 March 2000, and was won by Subaru's Richard Burns, his 7th win in the World Rally Championship.

Background

Entry list

Itinerary
All dates and times are CEST (UTC+2).

Results

Overall

World Rally Cars

Classification

Special stages

Championship standings

FIA Cup for Production Rally Drivers

Classification

Special stages

Championship standings

References

External links
 Official website of the World Rally Championship

2000 in Spanish motorsport
Rally Catalunya
2000 World Rally Championship season